Ivannikov is a Russian surname. Notable people with the surname include:

 Aleksandr Ivannikov (born 1945), Russian ski jumper
 Evgeny Ivannikov (born 1991), Russian ice hockey player
 Nikolai Ivannikov (born 1992), Russian footballer
 Valery Ivannikov (born 1976), Russian ice hockey player
 Viktor Ivannikov (1940–2016), Russian computer scientist